The 2018 Thailand motorcycle Grand Prix was the fifteenth round of the 2018 MotoGP season. It was held at the Buriram International Circuit in Buriram on 7 October 2018.

Classification

MotoGP

 Jorge Lorenzo withdrew from the event following a crash in practice.

Moto2

Moto3

Championship standings after the race

MotoGP

Moto2

Moto3

Notes

References

Thailand
Motorcycle Grand Prix
Thailand motorcycle Grand Prix
Thailand motorcycle Grand Prix